Trevor Parkes (born May 13, 1991) is a Canadian professional ice hockey player, who is currently playing for EHC München of the Deutsche Eishockey Liga (DEL).

Playing career

Junior
During the 2009–10 QMJHL season, Parkes played for Montreal in the QMJHL as an 18-year-old rookie. In 66 games with the Montreal Juniors he recorded 27 goals and 20 assists. Seven of Parkes' goals came on the power play. The Juniors reached the playoffs after finishing second in their division and in the seven-game, first-round series with Gatineau he recorded six goals and one assist.

During the 2010–11 QMJHL season, Parkes played in 60 games and finished the season with 33 goals and 29 assists. Parkes added six goals and two assists during Montreal's 10 game playoff stint.

Professional
On September 23, 2010, the Detroit Red Wings signed Parkes to a three-year entry-level contract.

Parkes made his professional debut for the Grand Rapids Griffins during the 2011–12 AHL season. Parkes played in 44 games with Grand Rapids, where he recorded two goals and six assists.

During the 2012–13 AHL season, Parkes played in 36 regular season games for AHL Calder Cup champion Grand Rapids in his second pro season and was one of the top scorers for the ECHL's Toledo Walleye. Parkes recorded three goals and six assists in 36 games with the Griffins. He did not play for Grand Rapids in the AHL playoffs. Parkes recorded 14 goals and 16 assists in 19 regular season games for Toledo. He was tied for second in scoring for the Walleye in their playoff series with Cincinnati — scoring three goals and 2 assists in six games.

Following the 2013-14 season, the Red Wings did not extend a qualifying offer to Parkes, resulting in him becoming an unrestricted free agent.  On September 5, 2014, the Greenville Road Warriors of the ECHL announced that he had signed with the team. After 7 games with the Warriors, Parkes was traded to the Utah Grizzlies in exchange for Charles-Olivier Roussel on November 7, 2014 but returned to Greenville prior to playing any games with Utah. On February 3, 2015, Parkes was loaned to the Worcester Sharks of the AHL and after three games the Sharks signed him to a Standard Player Contract.

On July 16, 2015, Parkes followed the San Jose Sharks affiliate relocation, in signing a one-year AHL contract with the San Jose Barracuda.

On September 1, 2016 it was announced that Parkes will follow his former teammates Mark Cundari and Evan Trupp to Europe to play his first season in Germany with Augsburger Panther of the Deutsche Eishockey Liga (DEL). After his second season with Augsburger in 2017–18, Parkes opted to leave the club as a free agent and sign a one-year contract with rival DEL participant, EHC München on May 2, 2018.

Career statistics

References

External links

1991 births
Living people
Augsburger Panther players
Canadian ice hockey right wingers
Grand Rapids Griffins players
Greenville Road Warriors players
Montreal Junior Hockey Club players
EHC München players
San Jose Barracuda players
Toledo Walleye players
Worcester Sharks players
Canadian expatriate ice hockey players in Germany